Riverside Park is an urban park located in and administered by the city of Pittsville, Wisconsin. The park was named for its location on the Yellow River.

Amenities include a disc golf course.

References

Geography of Wood County, Wisconsin
Parks in Wisconsin